State Road 391 (SR 391) is carried mainly by Airport Road (a.k.a. Airport Drive) in Bay County, Florida. Its southern terminus is at U.S. Route 231 (US 231 or SR 75), where it is carried briefly by Harrison Avenue. Its northern terminus is at SR 390.

Before the late 1970s, the state-maintained portion continued along Airport Road to its intersection with SR 327 (Lisenby Avenue) at the local major airport. In the late 1970s, county stickers were affixed to the state road signs along this portion of the highway. This segment is now maintained locally and has no highway number shields.

Major intersections

References

External links

391
391
391